Henri Christophe Dickerson (August 25, 1939 – December 23, 2021) was an American professional bodybuilder.

Early life
Dickerson was born in Montgomery, Alabama, on August 25, 1939. He was the youngest of triplets. His mother, Mahala Ashley Dickerson, was a lawyer and civil rights advocate for women and minorities. He graduated high school at Olney Friends School in 1957.

Bodybuilding career
One of the world's most titled bodybuilders, Dickerson's competitive career spanned thirty years; he was known for both his heavily muscled, symmetrical physique and for his skills on the posing dais.

Dickerson first entered bodybuilding competition in 1965 by taking third place at that year's Mr. Long Beach competition.  He turned pro in 1973 and won a total of 15 professional bodybuilding titles across four organizations during his career.

He trained for many of his most important competitions in the 1980s with former Mr. Universe Bill Pearl.

Dickerson was the first African-American AAU Mr. America, the first openly gay winner of the IFBB Mr. Olympia contest, and one of only two bodybuilders (along with Dexter Jackson) to win titles in both the Mr. Olympia and Masters Olympia competitions.

He won the Mr. Olympia once (1982), a distinction he shares with Samir Bannout (1983) and Dexter Jackson (2008) who have since retired, as well as Shawn Rhoden (2018) and Brandon Curry (2019).

Dickerson retired after winning the 50+ division at the 1994 Masters Olympia and was inducted into the IFBB Hall of Fame in 2000. Dickerson lived in Florida where he continued to train, conduct seminars, and correspond with current athletes.

Modeling
During the 1960s, Dickerson did much physique modeling. His 1970s nude work for photographer Jim French is today considered some of the best in an admittedly limited field. He appeared in French's hardcover photo essay, Man (1972), and also posed for the photographer ten years later. These photos ran in an issue of Olympus, published by Colt Studios.

Personal life and death
Dickerson died on December 23, 2021, at the age of 82, from heart failure.

Bodybuilding titles

 1966 Mr North America - AAU, 2nd
 1966 Mr New York State - AAU, Overall Winner
 1966 Mr Eastern America - AAU, Overall Winner
 1966 Mr Atlantic Coast - AAU, Overall Winner
 1966 Junior Mr USA - AAU, Most Muscular, 1st
 1966 Junior Mr USA - AAU, Winner
 1967 Mr California - AAU, Winner
 1967 Mr America - AAU, Most Muscular, 4th
 1967 Mr America - AAU, 6th
 1967 Junior Mr America - AAU, Most Muscular, 5th
 1967 Junior Mr America - AAU, 4th
 1968 Mr USA - AAU, Most Muscular, 2nd
 1968 Mr USA - AAU, Winner
 1968 Mr America - AAU, Most Muscular, 3rd
 1968 Mr America - AAU, 3rd
 1968 Junior Mr America - AAU, 3rd
 1969 Mr America - AAU, 2nd
 1969 Junior Mr America - AAU, 2nd
 1970 Universe - NABBA, Short, 1st
 1970 Mr America - AAU, Most Muscular, 1st
 1970 Mr America - AAU, Winner
 1970 Junior Mr America - AAU, Most Muscular, 1st
 1970 Junior Mr America - AAU, Winner
 1971 Universe - NABBA, Short, 1st
 1973 Universe - NABBA, Short, 1st
 1973 Universe - NABBA, Overall Winner
 1973 Pro Mr America - WBBG, Winner
 1974 Universe - Pro - NABBA, Short, 1st
 1974 Universe - Pro - NABBA, Overall Winner
 1975 World Championships - WBBG, 2nd
 1975 Universe - Pro - PBBA, 2nd
 1976 Universe - Pro - NABBA, Short, 2nd
 1976 Universe - Pro - NABBA, 3rd
 1976 Olympus - WBBG, 4th
 1979 Mr. Olympia - IFBB, Lightweight, 4th
 1979 Grand Prix Vancouver - IFBB, 2nd
 1979 Canada Pro Cup - IFBB, Winner
 1979 Canada Diamond Pro Cup - IFBB, 2nd
 1980 Pittsburgh Pro Invitational - IFBB, 2nd
 1980 Mr. Olympia - IFBB, 2nd
 1980 Night of Champions - IFBB, Winner
 1980 Grand Prix New York - IFBB, Winner
 1980 Grand Prix Miami - IFBB, Winner
 1980 Grand Prix Louisiana - IFBB, 2nd
 1980 Grand Prix California - IFBB, Winner
 1980 Florida Pro Invitational - IFBB, Winner
 1980 Canada Pro Cup - IFBB, Winner
 1981 Professional World Cup - IFBB, 2nd
 1981 Mr. Olympia - IFBB, 2nd
 1981 Night of Champions - IFBB, Winner
 1981 Grand Prix World Cup - IFBB, 2nd
 1981 Grand Prix Washington - IFBB, Winner
 1981 Grand Prix New York - IFBB, Winner
 1981 Grand Prix New England - IFBB, 2nd
 1981 Grand Prix Louisiana - IFBB, Winner
 1981 Grand Prix California - IFBB, Winner
 1982 Mr. Olympia - IFBB, Winner
 1984 Mr. Olympia - IFBB, 11th
 1990 Arnold Classic - IFBB, 8th
 1994 Masters Olympia - IFBB, Overall, 4th

References

External links 
 IFBB Hall of Fame
 Chris Dickerson passes away at 82
 Chris Dickerson Gallery 
 

| colspan="3" style="text-align:center;"| Mr. Olympia 
|- 
|  style="width:30%; text-align:center;"| Preceded by:Franco Columbu
|  style="width:40%; text-align:center;"| First (1982)
|  style="width:30%; text-align:center;"| Succeeded by:Samir Bannout

1939 births
2021 deaths
African-American bodybuilders
African-American male models
African-American models
American male models
American male adult models
Gay sportsmen
LGBT African Americans
Gay models
LGBT people from Florida
LGBT people from New York (state)
American LGBT sportspeople
Professional bodybuilders
Sportspeople from Manhattan
Sportspeople from Florida
American sportsmen
LGBT bodybuilders
21st-century African-American people
20th-century African-American sportspeople
21st-century LGBT people